Olatunde C. Johnson (born 1968) is an American legal scholar. She teaches at Columbia Law School as Jerome B. Sherman Professor of Law.

Johnson graduated from Yale College in 1989 with a Bachelor of Arts degree, and from Stanford Law School with a Juris Doctor degree in 1995. She became a law clerk for David Tatel and John Paul Stevens, then worked for the NAACP Legal Defense Fund for four years before advising Edward M. Kennedy on constitutional and civil rights matters from 2001 to 2003. She is an elected member of the American Law Institute.

References

1968 births
Living people
African-American legal scholars
Columbia Law School faculty
American women legal scholars
American legal scholars
Stanford Law School alumni
Members of the American Law Institute
Yale College alumni
African-American women lawyers
21st-century American women lawyers
21st-century American lawyers
20th-century American women lawyers
20th-century American lawyers
21st-century African-American women
20th-century African-American women
20th-century African-American people